Mikhail Nikolayevich Gordeychuk (born 23 October 1989) is a Belarusian footballer who plays for Dinamo Brest.

Career

Club
On 27 December 2018, FC Tobol announced the signing of Gordeychuk on a two-year contract from BATE Borisov. On 26 July 2019, Gordeichuk left FC Tobol by mutual consent.

International
Gordeychuk was a member of the Belarus Olympic team that participated in the 2012 Summer Olympics.

International goals
As of match played 31 May 2016. Belarus score listed first, score column indicates score after each Gordeychuk goal.

Honours
BATE Borisov
Belarusian Premier League champion: 2011, 2014, 2015, 2016, 2017, 2018
Belarusian Cup winner: 2014–15
Belarusian Super Cup winner: 2011, 2015, 2017

Dinamo Brest
Belarusian Premier League champion: 2019, 2020

References

External links
 
 

1989 births
Living people
People from Karaganda Region
Belarusian footballers
Association football midfielders
Belarusian expatriate footballers
Expatriate footballers in Kazakhstan
Expatriate footballers in Latvia
Olympic footballers of Belarus
Footballers at the 2012 Summer Olympics
Belarus international footballers
FC Shakhter Karagandy players
FC Volna Pinsk players
FC Naftan Novopolotsk players
FC BATE Borisov players
FC Belshina Bobruisk players
FC Tobol players
FC Dynamo Brest players
FK Liepāja players